La calle en que vivimos is a Mexican telenovela produced by Televisa for Telesistema Mexicano in 1965.

Cast 
Andrea Palma
Alejandro Ciangherotti
Jaime Fernández
Rafael Llamas

References

External links 

Mexican telenovelas
1965 telenovelas
Televisa telenovelas
Spanish-language telenovelas
1965 Mexican television series debuts
1965 Mexican television series endings